Cratilla is a genus of dragonflies in the family Libellulidae. They are distributed in Southeast Asia.

Species
Species include:

References

Libellulidae
Anisoptera genera